Senetářov is a municipality and village in Blansko District in the South Moravian Region of the Czech Republic. It has about 600 inhabitants.

Geography
It lies in the Drahany Highlands. Several small brooks flow through the municipality.

History
The first written mention of Senetářov is from 1349.

Sights

Senetářov is known for the Church of Saint Joseph. It was built by the citizens in 1969–1971, during the Communist era when the construction permits for new churches were rare. The consecration of the church was attended by 15,000 people who came together from all over the country. The state secret police however closed all roads leading to the village, thus not allowing buses with Catholic worshippers to enter it. The mass attendees had to park in the fields and come on foot.

The church is an extravagant building, designed by architect Ludvík Kolek, who was inspired by Le Corbusier. Today, the building is considered a gem of modern architecture. The interior decoration is dominated by 14 paintings of the Stations of the Cross by Mikuláš Medek.

References

External links

Villages in Blansko District